Tom Colverd (born 13 November 1995) is an English cricketer. He played six first-class matches for Cambridge University Cricket Club between 2016 and 2018.

See also
 List of Cambridge University Cricket Club players
 List of Cambridge UCCE & MCCU players

References

External links
 

1995 births
Living people
English cricketers
Cambridge University cricketers
Sportspeople from Tokyo
Cambridge MCCU cricketers